Archernis eucosma is a moth in the family Crambidae. It was described by Turner in 1908. It is found in Australia, where it has been recorded Queensland.

The forewings are grey or brown with two black marks and an undulating line. There is one black mark, as well as a wiggly line on the hindwings.

References

Moths described in 1908
Spilomelinae
Moths of Australia